Nimmala Rama Naidu (born 6 May 1969) is an Indian politician and a member of the Andhra Pradesh Legislative Assembly. He was first elected in 2014 as a member of the Telugu Desam Party in the Palakollu constituency. He is the incumbent MLA of the Palakollu constituency, who won the 2019 elections from Telugu Desam Party, the current opposition party in the state of Andhra Pradesh.

References

Living people
1969 births
Andhra Pradesh MLAs 2014–2019
Telugu Desam Party politicians
Telugu politicians
Place of birth missing (living people)
People from West Godavari district
Andhra Pradesh MLAs 2019–2024
Politicians from Palakollu